Erik Hulzebosch (born 17 June 1970) is a Dutch marathon speed skater, inline speed skater and part-time singer and blogger at his own website.

Born in Ane, Gramsbergen Hulzebosch started as a cyclo-cross cyclist. In marathon speed skating he won several races on both artificial and nature track races, making his debut in 1987. He was the 1992 World Champion in inline skating. During the 1997 Elfstedentocht Hulzebosch was favourite to win the title, but was outsprinted in the final metres by Henk Angenent. Hulzebosch is known for his Eastern Dutch accent and his popularity in these days resulted in a top-15 hit called "Hulzebosch Hulzebosch" in 1997 as well. He is married to long track speed skater Jenita Hulzebosch-Smit, sister of Olympic silver medalist Gretha Smit.

Honours

Speed skating
this list is incomplete
1991 – 1st in Open Dutch natural track marathon championships (100 km)
1993 – 1st in Dutch natural track marathon championships (100 km)
1995 – 1st in Amstelmeermarathon (100 km)
1995 – 1st in Veluwemeertocht in Elburg (100 km)
1995 – 2nd in Holland Venetië in Giethoorn race (100 km)
1996 – 1st in Holland Venetië in Giethoorn race (50 km)
1997 – 2nd in 15th Elfstedentocht (200 km)
2007 – 1st in Borlänge Marathon (150 km)

Inline speed skating
this list is incomplete
1986 – 1st in Dutch national championships, B-riders
1988 – 1st in Heineken Inline Skating Race (200 km)
1988 – 3rd in Dutch national championships
1988 – named as Sportsman of the year in Gramsbergen
1989 – 1st in Heineken Inline Skating Race (200 km)
1989 – 1st in Wehkamp Trophy
1989 – named as Sportsman of the year in Gramsbergen
1990 – 1st in Wehkamp Trophy
1991 – 1st in Wehkamp Trophy
1992 – 1st in World Championships marathon (42,195 m)
1992 - 2nd in World Championships 20,000 meter elimination race

Discography
1997 – Hulzebosch Hulzebosch, highest position: 15th, number of weeks: 5
1998 – Foie foie foie / Ik vin oe sexie, highest position: tip, number of weeks: 0

External links
Official website

1970 births
Living people
People from Hardenberg
Dutch bloggers
Dutch pop singers
Dutch roller skaters
Dutch male speed skaters
21st-century Dutch singers
Male bloggers
Sportspeople from Overijssel